Maintenance of Migrants' Pension Rights Convention, 1935 (shelved) is an International Labour Organization Convention.

It was established in 1935, with the preamble stating:
Having decided upon the adoption of certain proposals with regard to the maintenance of rights in course of acquisition and acquired rights under invalidity, old-age and widows' and orphans' insurance on behalf of workers who transfer their residence from one country to another, which is the first item on the agenda of the Session, and having determined that these proposals shall take the form of an international Convention, adopts this twenty-second day of June of the year one thousand nine hundred and thirty-five the following Convention, which may be cited as the Maintenance of Migrants' Pension Rights Convention, 1935:

Ratifications
Prior to it being shelved, the convention was ratified by 12 states.

References

External links 
Text.
Ratifications.

Disability law
Migrant workers
Shelved International Labour Organization conventions
Pensions
Treaties concluded in 1935
Treaties entered into force in 1938